Onehunga railway station is the final station on the Onehunga Line of the Auckland railway network in New Zealand. It is located at the southern end of Onehunga Town Centre and consists of a single side platform which is accessed from Onehunga Mall and Princes Street.

History

The current station is the third to have served Onehunga. The original station opened in 1873, and was situated adjacent to Princes Street, to the north-east of the current station. Additionally, the Onehunga Wharf railway station served the Port of Onehunga from 1878 to 1927.

Through services to Auckland railway station ceased in 1950, but passenger trains continued running between Onehunga and Penrose, to connect with mainline services into Auckland, until April 1973. The station closed following the withdrawal of passenger service but the line through the station remained open for freight trains until 2006.

The new station was opened on 18 September 2010 and services started on 19 September 2010. The station was first served by electric trains on 28 April 2014, with the Onehunga Line being the first line to switch to using AM Class Electric Multiple Units.

Transport Links

There are two bus stops located on Onehunga Mall near the entrance to the station, which are served by buses travelling between Onehunga and the southern suburbs including Manukau, Māngere and Auckland Airport, as well as a cross-town route 670 which runs between Ōtāhuhu and New Lynn. Onehunga Bus Station is located approximately 200m north of the station and is a major hub for Auckland's bus network. The Onehunga railway station is the closest rail stop to the popular outlet mall, Dress Smart.

Bus services 36, 38, 68, 298, 670 and 743 serve Onehunga station.

See also
 Onehunga Branch
 Public transport in Auckland
 Transport in Auckland
 List of Auckland railway stations

References

Railway stations in New Zealand
Rail transport in Auckland
Railway stations opened in 1873
Railway stations closed in 1973
Railway stations opened in 2010
1873 establishments in New Zealand